The Bahadurkhel mine is a large salt mine located in the village Bahadur Khel, in the Pakistani province Khyber Pakhtunkhwa. Bahadurkhel represents one of the largest salt reserves in Pakistan having estimated reserves of 10.5 billion tonnes of NaCl.

References

External links
Bahadur Khel / Karak Salt Mines

Mines in Pakistan
Salt mines in Pakistan